Khinkali ( khink’ali , sometimes Romanized hinkali or xinkali)  is a dumpling in Georgian cuisine. It is made of twisted knobs of dough, stuffed with meat, fish or vegetables and spices.

Ingredients
The fillings of khinkali vary with the area. The original recipe, the so-called khevsuruli, consisted of only minced meat (lamb or beef and pork mixed), onions, chili pepper, salt, and cumin. However, the modern recipe used mostly especially in Georgian urban areas, the so-called kalakuri, uses herbs like parsley and coriander. Mushrooms, potatoes, or cheese may be used in place of meat.

Etiquette
Khinkali is eaten plain or with ground black pepper. The meat filling is uncooked when khinkali is assembled, so when it is cooked, the juices of the meat are trapped inside the dumpling. To make khinkali juicier, usually warm water or broth is added to the minced meat. Khinkali is typically consumed first by sucking the juices while taking the first bite, similar to xiaolongbao, in order to prevent the dumpling from bursting. The top, where the pleats meet, is tough, and is not supposed to be eaten, but discarded to the plate so that those eating can count how many they have consumed. In Georgia, this top is called the kudi (Georgian: კუდი, "tail") or k'uch'i (Georgian: კუჭი, "stomach").

There is a widespread etiquette in Georgia to use only one's bare hands while consuming these dumplings. The using of utensils, like a fork, is considered incorrect or childish. This is because juice is an important part of khinkali; using a fork will rupture the khinkali and the juice will be spilled.

Origins 
The origins of the khinkali are not clear: some consider it a result of the Mongolian conquests, and others support it was created in the Georgian mountains.

According to some legends, khinkali originates from Mongolia and reached Georgia around the 13th century (Georgia being located on the Silk Road). Mongolian conquerors would put their meat in dough in order to better conserve it while riding their horses. They themselves probably learned to make dumplings from their chinese neighbors.

However, according to other sources, the traditional dish was invented in the Georgian mountains North of Tbilissi. It used to be a dish eaten mostly by shepherds during cold and snowy winters. The invention is disputed by both people from the Tusheti and the Pshavi regions.

Initially, khinkalis were stuffed with lamb as it was the most common meat eaten in the mountains. Then, variations were created as it became more popular and reached urban areas. Thus, pork or beef began to be used as a stuffing, and then vegetarian versions were developed.

Regions
Khinkali from Pasanauri is regarded as superior to that from other towns in Georgia.

See also
 Hingel
 Manti
 Xiaolongbao

References

External links

(in Georgian)
Khinkali recipe (in English)

Dumplings
Cuisine of Georgia (country)
Georgian products with protected designation of origin
Soviet cuisine
National dishes